Platphalonia is a genus of moths belonging to the family Tortricidae.

Species
Platphalonia mystica (Razowski & Becker, 1994)

See also
List of Tortricidae genera

References

 , 2011: Diagnoses and remarks on genera of Tortricidae, 2: Cochylini (Lepidoptera: Tortricidae). Shilap Revista de Lepidopterologia 39 (156): 397–414.

Cochylini